The Milk River is a  stream in Wayne County and Macomb County, Michigan, flowing into Lake St. Clair. It flows through the cities of Grosse Pointe Woods and St. Clair Shores.

Over half of the river is now underground including the low, inland area of the once swampy Black Marsh Ditch. The decision to contain and bury the river was made August 18th, 1955 at a Draining Board Meeting of officials from the State of Michigan, Macomb County, and Oakland County. Now only open to the air past the Milk River Pump Station on Parkway Drive.

See also
List of rivers of Michigan
Subterranean Rivers of the United States

References

Michigan  Streamflow Data from the USGS

Rivers of Michigan
Rivers of Wayne County, Michigan
Rivers of Macomb County, Michigan
Tributaries of Lake Erie

Subterranean rivers of the United States